Stephen P. Stich (born May 9, 1943) is an American academic who is Distinguished Professor of Philosophy and Cognitive Science at Rutgers University, as well as an Honorary Professor in Philosophy at the University of Sheffield. Stich's main philosophical interests are in the philosophy of mind, epistemology, and moral psychology. His 1983 book, From Folk Psychology to Cognitive Science: The Case Against Belief, received much attention as he argued for a form of eliminative materialism about the mind. He changed his mind, in later years, as indicated in his 1996 book Deconstructing the Mind.

Education and career
Stich was an undergraduate at the University of Pennsylvania from 1960–1964 where he was a member of the Philomathean Society. He received his BA in 1964 (Summa Cum Laude with distinction in Philosophy). He did graduate work at Princeton University from 1964–1968, receiving his PhD in 1968 under the direction of Paul Benacerraf and Gilbert Harman.

He has held full-time teaching positions at University of Michigan (1968-1978), University of Maryland, College Park (1978-1986), University of California, San Diego (1986-1989), and, since 1989, at Rutgers University.

Stich joined the University of Sheffield as an honorary professor in their philosophy department in February 2005. He remains primarily at Rutgers, but visits Sheffield periodically, where he teaches and works at the Hang Seng Centre for Cognitive Studies.

In 2007 he was awarded the Jean Nicod Prize and gave a series of lectures in Paris titled Moral Theory Meets Cognitive Science: How the Cognitive Science Can Transform Traditional Debates.

In 2009, he was elected a Fellow of the American Academy of Arts and Sciences.

In 2020, he became a visiting professor at Princeton University through the University Center for Human Values.

Philosophical work
Stich is primarily known in philosophy for his work in the philosophy of mind, cognitive science, epistemology, and moral psychology.  In philosophy of mind and cognitive science, Stich (1983) has argued for a form of eliminative materialism—the view that talk of the mental should be replaced with talk of its physical substrate.  Since then, however, he has changed some of his views on the mind. See Deconstructing the Mind (1996) for his more recent views. In epistemology, he has explored (with several of his colleagues) the nature of intuitions using the techniques of experimental philosophy, especially epistemic intuitions that vary among cultures—see Stich (1988) and Stich, et al. (2001).  This work reflects a general skepticism about conceptual analysis and the traditional methods of analytic philosophy. In The Fragmentation of Reason he briefly sketched a form of epistemic relativism "in the spirit of pragmatism."

He and Shaun Nichols are responsible for a theory of how humans understand the mental states of ourselves and others, or mindreading, which they present in Nichols and Stich (2003).  Their theory is a hybrid, containing elements of both the simulation theory and theory theory, and also aims to explain the mental architecture that enables pretence.

Selected publications
 1972, "Grammar, Psychology and Indeterminacy", Journal of Philosophy, LXIX, 22, pp. 799–818.
 1978, "Empiricism, Innateness and Linguistic Universals", Philosophical Studies, Vol. 33, No. 3, pp. 273–286.
 1978, "Beliefs and Sub-Doxastic States", Philosophy of Science, Vol. 45, No. 4, pp. 499–518.
 1979, "Do Animals Have Beliefs?" The Australasian Journal of Philosophy, Vol. 57, No. 1, pp. 15–28.
 1983, From Folk Psychology to Cognitive Science: The Case Against Belief, MIT Press.
 1985, "Could Man Be An Irrational Animal?" Synthese, Vol. 64, No. 1, pp. 115–135.
 1988, "Reflective Equilibrium, Analytic Epistemology and the Problem of Cognitive Diversity", Synthese, Vol. 74, No. 3, pp. 391–413.
 1990, "Connectionism, Eliminativism and the Future of Folk Psychology", Philosophical Perspectives, Vol. 4, pp. 499–533. (with William Ramsey & Joseph Garon)
 1990, The Fragmentation of Reason: Preface to a Pragmatic Theory of Cognitive Evaluation, MIT Press.
 1992, "What Is a Theory of Mental Representation?" Mind, Vol. 101, No. 402, pp. 243–61.
 1993, "Naturalizing Epistemology: Quine, Simon and the Prospects for Pragmatism", in C. Hookway & D. Peterson (eds.), Philosophy and Cognitive Science, Royal Institute of Philosophy, Supplement no. 34 (Cambridge: Cambridge University Press), pp. 1–17. Online text
 1996, Deconstructing the Mind, Oxford University Press. Chapter 1 online
 1998, "The Flight to Reference, or How Not to Make Progress in the Philosophy of Science", (with Michael Bishop) Philosophy of Science, Vol. 65, No. 1, pp. 33–49. Online text
 1998, "Theory Theory to the Max", (with Shaun Nichols) Mind and Language, Vol. 13, No. 3, pp. 421–49. Online text
 2001, "Jackson's Empirical Assumptions", (with Jonathan Weinberg) Philosophy and Phenomenological Research, Vol. 62, No. 3, pp. 637–643. Online text
 2003, Mindreading, (co-authored with Shaun Nichols) Oxford University Press.
 2006, "Two Theories about the Cognitive Architecture Underlying Morality", (with Daniel Kelley), Online Philosophy Conference, Online PDF (presently 404)
 2012, "Collected Papers, Volume 2:  Knowledge, Rationality, and Morality, 1978-2010", Oxford University Press, 2012,  .
 2017, "Gettier Across Cultures", (with Edouard Machery, Stephen Stich, David Rose, Amita Chatterjee, Kaori Karasawa, Noel Struchiner, Smita Sirker, Naoki Usui, and Takaaki Hashimoto) Nous, Vol. 51.

See also
 American philosophy
 List of American philosophers
 List of Jean Nicod Prize laureates

References

External links

 Stich's Website
 Stich's profile at Rutgers
 Stich's web site at Rutgers
 Stich's profile at the University of Sheffield

Academics of the University of Sheffield
American cognitive scientists
Philosophers of mind
Washington University in St. Louis faculty
Jean Nicod Prize laureates
Living people
1943 births
20th-century American philosophers
21st-century American philosophers
Moral psychologists
Epistemologists
Distinguished professors of philosophy